School District 61 Greater Victoria is a school district in the Canadian province of British Columbia. This includes Victoria, the municipalities of Esquimalt, Oak Bay, View Royal, and parts of Saanich.

History

The earliest history of schools in Western Canada is within the boundary of the current Greater Victoria School district. The first school in the area that is present day British Columbia was established at Fort Victoria in the 1840s. A plaque to commemorate this can be found on the side of the Christmas Store on Government and Fort Street in downtown Victoria.

The first public school was opened in 1853 near what is now Central Middle School. This building later became Victoria High School.

When the area became part of the province of British Columbia there were already three school districts in the area: the Victoria City School District (established on June 25, 1869), the Esquimalt School District (October 22, 1870) and Craigflower School District (July 23, 1870).

Schools

See also
List of school districts in British Columbia

References

External links
 

Education in Victoria, British Columbia
61